Gliese 1214 b (often shortened to GJ 1214 b) is an exoplanet that orbits the star Gliese 1214, and was discovered in December 2009. Its parent star is 48 light-years from the Sun, in the constellation Ophiuchus. As of 2017, GJ 1214 b is the most likely known candidate for being an ocean planet. For that reason, scientists have nicknamed the planet "the waterworld".

It is a super-Earth, meaning it is larger than Earth but is significantly smaller (in mass and radius) than the gas giants of the Solar System. After CoRoT-7b, it was the second super-Earth to have both its mass and radius measured and is the first of a new class of planets with small size and relatively low density. GJ 1214 b is also significant because its parent star is relatively near the Sun and because it transits (crosses in front of) that parent star, which allows the planet's atmosphere to be studied using spectroscopic methods.

In December 2013, NASA reported that clouds may have been detected in the atmosphere of GJ 1214 b.

In August 2022, this planet and its host star were included among 20 systems to be named by the third NameExoWorlds project.

Detection 
GJ 1214 b was first detected by the MEarth Project, which searches for the small drops in brightness that can occur when an orbiting planet briefly passes in front of its parent star.  In early 2009, the astronomers running the project noticed that the star GJ 1214 appeared to show drops in brightness of that sort.  They then observed the star more closely and confirmed that it dimmed by roughly 1.5% every 1.58 days.  Follow-up radial-velocity measurements were then made with the HARPS spectrograph on the ESO's 3.6-meter telescope at La Silla, Chile; those measurements succeeded in providing independent evidence for the reality of the planet.  A paper was then published in Nature announcing the planet and giving estimates of its mass, radius, and orbital parameters.

Features 

The radius of GJ 1214 b can be inferred from the amount of dimming seen when the planet crosses in front of its parent star as viewed from Earth.  The mass of the planet can be inferred from sensitive observations of the parent star's radial velocity, measured through small shifts in stellar spectral lines due to the Doppler effect. Given the planet's mass and radius, its density can be calculated. Through a comparison with theoretical models, the density in turn provides limited but highly useful information about the composition and structure of the planet.

Due to the relatively small size of GJ 1214 b's parent star, it is feasible to perform spectroscopic observations during planetary transits.  By comparing the observed spectrum before and during transits, the spectrum of the planetary atmosphere can be inferred. In December 2010, a study was published showing the spectrum to be largely featureless over the wavelength range of 750–1000 nm. Because a thick and cloud-free hydrogen-rich atmosphere would have produced detectable spectral features, such an atmosphere appears to be ruled out. Although no clear signs were observed of water vapor or any other molecule, the authors of the study believe the planet may have an atmosphere composed mainly of water vapor. Another possibility is that there may be a thick layer of high clouds, which absorbs the starlight. 
Because of the estimated old age of the planetary system and the calculated hydrodynamic escape (loss of gasses that tends to deplete an atmosphere of higher molecular-weight constituents) rate of 900 tonnes per second, scientists conclude that there has been a significant atmospheric loss during the lifetime of the planet and any current atmosphere cannot be primordial. The loss of primordial atmosphere was indirectly confirmed in 2020 as no helium was detected at Gliese 1214 b. Helium was detected in the atmosphere of Gliese 1214 b by 2022 though.

GJ 1214 b may be cooler than any other known transiting planet prior to the discovery of Kepler-16b in 2011 by the Kepler mission.

Speculation based on planetary models 
While very little is known about GJ 1214 b, there has been speculation as to its specific nature and composition.  On the basis of planetary models it has been suggested that GJ 1214 b has a relatively thick gaseous envelope, totaling about 5% of planetary mass. It is possible to propose structures by assuming different compositions, guided by scenarios for the formation and evolution of the planet. GJ 1214 b could be a rocky planet with an outgassed hydrogen-rich atmosphere, a mini-Neptune, or an ocean planet. If it is a waterworld, it could possibly be thought of as a bigger and hotter version of Jupiter's Galilean moon Europa.  While no scientist has stated to believe GJ 1214 b is an ocean planet, if GJ 1214 b is assumed to be an ocean planet, i.e. the interior is assumed to be composed primarily of a water core surrounded by more water, proportions of the total mass consistent with the mass and radius are about 25% rock and 75% water, covered by a thick envelope of gases such as hydrogen and helium (c. 0.05%). Water planets could result from inward planetary migration and originate as protoplanets that formed from volatile ice-rich material beyond the snow-line but that never attained masses sufficient to accrete large amounts of H/He nebular gas. Because of the varying pressure at depth, models of a water world include "steam, liquid, superfluid, high-pressure ices, and plasma phases" of water. Some of the solid-phase water could be in the form of ice VII.

See also 
COROT-7b
Gliese 581 c
Gliese 581 d
Gliese 876 d
HD 149026 b
Lists of astronomical objects
MOA-2007-BLG-192Lb

References

External links 

Astronomers Find World with Thick, Inhospitable Atmosphere and an Icy Heart
MEarth Project
Hubble reveals a new class of planet
Astronomers have claimed the existence of a new class of planet: a "water-world" with a thick, steamy atmosphere.
An update on the atmosphere of super-Earth GJ1214b

Transiting exoplanets
Exoplanets discovered in 2009
Super-Earths
Ophiuchus (constellation)
1